In.com was an online venture from Web18, a Network 18 group company and one of India’s online networks based in Mumbai. It was on-line 11 years, from August 2008 to August 2019.  In.com was ranked No. 18 in the Alexa traffic rankings in India. The mail services of In.com shut down on 4 March 2015.

On August 20, 2019, the site went offline. Content was not moved elsewhere and links return HTTP 404 or redirect to the news18.com homepage as soft 404s.

References

External links

Network18 Group
Indian entertainment websites
Companies based in Mumbai
2008 establishments in Maharashtra
Internet properties established in 2008